The Czechoslovakian International (also known as International Championships of the ČSSR) in badminton was an international open held in Czechoslovakia since 1972 until 1992. The tournament succeeded by Czech Open. Czechoslovak National Badminton Championships were already established in 1961.

Winners

External links
http://www.badmintoneurope.com/file_download.aspx?id=4466

Badminton tournaments
Badminton in Czechoslovakia
Sports competitions in Czechoslovakia
1972 establishments in Czechoslovakia